Daniel Ciach (born 21 March 1990) is a Polish footballer who plays for Norwegian club Staal Jørpeland.

Career
In July 2010, he was loaned to GKP Gorzów Wlkp. on a one-year deal. He returned to Polonia Warsaw one year later. In July 2012, he transferred to the Polish I liga side Warta Poznań.

Honours
Dyskobolia Grodzisk Wlkp.
 Polish Cup: 2006–07

References

External links
 

1990 births
Living people
Polish footballers
Dyskobolia Grodzisk Wielkopolski players
Polonia Warsaw players
Stilon Gorzów Wielkopolski players
Warta Poznań players
Radomiak Radom players
Elana Toruń players
Staal Jørpeland IL players
Ekstraklasa players
I liga players
II liga players
III liga players
Norwegian Third Division players
Sportspeople from Gorzów Wielkopolski
Association football defenders
Polish expatriate footballers
Expatriate footballers in Germany
Polish expatriate sportspeople in Germany
Expatriate footballers in Norway
Polish expatriate sportspeople in Norway